"Untitled 08 | 09.06.2014." (stylized untitled 08 | 09.06.2014.), titled "Untitled 2" before its official release, is a jazz rap song by American rapper Kendrick Lamar, featured on his compilation album, untitled unmastered..

Composition 
Lyrically, the track discusses the futility of hopelessness in the face of adversity (mashed up with 'untitled 2' for Kendrick's Fallon performance in January). The lyrics show little optimism, though Lamar cushions his anger and disappointment with "irresistibly" feel-good vibes, suggesting there may be hope after all. USA Today described the narrative: "one of a young woman struggling with her come-up, the other an impoverished voice lashing out at Kendrick’s own accounts of his struggles. Both stories dissolve into his own, as he ends the album questioning what exactly we're owed by the universe for existing, and how hard we need to fight for what we're not." Musically, critics compared the song with "King Kunta", for its hydraulic-pumping synthesized bass thump and Lamar's slangy flow.

Live performances 
The song was performed for the public for the first time on January 7, 2016, on The Tonight Show Starring Jimmy Fallon.

Charts

References

2016 songs
Kendrick Lamar songs
Songs written by Kendrick Lamar
Song recordings produced by DJ Khalil